Stephen Christopher Pikiell (born November 21, 1967) is an American college basketball coach and, since March 16th, 2016, the head men's basketball coach at Rutgers. Prior to Rutgers, Pikiell was the head coach at Stony Brook for over a decade, leading the Seawolves to their first NCAA Tournament appearance in 2016.

In 2021, Pikiell led Rutgers to its first NCAA Tournament appearance in 30 years.

Early years and playing career

Born and raised in Bristol, Connecticut, Pikiell was one of nine children and graduated from St. Paul Catholic High School in Bristol in 1986. At the University of Connecticut, Pikiell was a point guard, two-year captain and four-year letterwinner for the Huskies from 1987 to 1991. He played in 106 career games and averaged 8.2 points a game as a freshman. While Pikiell was the team captain, Connecticut won its first Big East title and advanced to the Elite Eight and Sweet Sixteen. In 1991, Pikiell was given the UConn Club Senior Athlete Award for outstanding contributions to UConn athletics.

Coaching

After graduation, Pikiell stayed on as an assistant to the UConn staff before moving on to Yale University, as an assistant coach from 1992–95. During 1995-96, Pikiell served as the interim head coach at Wesleyan University. Then, his former coach and colleague Howie Dickenman became the head coach at Central Connecticut State and hired Pikiell as an assistant coach, where he stayed from 1997–2001, with the Blue Devils reaching the NCAA Tournament in 2000. Pikiell joined fellow UConn alum Karl Hobbs as an assistant at George Washington from 2001–05, where he was part of the Colonials 2004 NIT and 2005 NCAA tournament squads.

Stony Brook

On April 13, 2005, Pikiell replaced Nick Macarchuk as the 10th head coach in program history. At the time, Pikiell became the first Connecticut alum who played for Calhoun to coach a Division I program.

Taking over a program that transitioned to Division I in 1999, Stony Brook endured three-straight losing seasons in his first three years. In the 2008–09 season, the Seawolves went 16–14 for its first winning season as Division I program. The following year in 2009–10, Stony Brook earned their first regular season championship with a 22–10, 13–3 record, ending with a semifinal loss in the tournament. By virtue of winning the regular season, Stony Brook earned an NIT bid but lost to Illinois. Pikiell guided the Seawolves to a 15–17 mark in 2010–11, making a run to the America East Championship game after an upset over top-seeded Vermont in the semifinals, but lost to Boston on a last-second foul.

From 2011 to 2016, Stony Brook won three America East regular season titles, while winning the conference tournament for the first time in school history in 2016 en route to the Seawolves' first NCAA tournament appearance. In that span, Stony Brook went 117–47, while appearing in two NIT and two CBI tournaments in addition to the NCAA Tournament appearance. His overall record at Stony Brook was 192–155 in 11 seasons.

Rutgers

On March 19, 2016, Pikiell was announced as the next coach at Rutgers. During the 2019–20 season, Pikiell led Rutgers to a 20–11 overall record and 11–9 in the Big Ten Conference. He earned the Jim Phelan Award for national coach of the year from Colleginsiders.com.

On March 14, 2021, Pikiell's Rutgers team was named to the NCAA Tournament for the first time since the 1990–91 season. The Scarlet Knights earned a 10 seed in the tournament.

On March 19, 2021, Rutgers won its first NCAA Tournament game in 38 years, beating Clemson 60–56. This was also Pikiell's first win as a coach in the NCAA Tournament.

Head coaching record

References

1967 births
Living people
American men's basketball coaches
American men's basketball players
Basketball coaches from Connecticut
Basketball players from Connecticut
Central Connecticut Blue Devils men's basketball coaches
College men's basketball head coaches in the United States
George Washington Colonials men's basketball coaches
People from Bristol, Connecticut
Point guards
Rutgers Scarlet Knights men's basketball coaches
Stony Brook Seawolves men's basketball coaches
UConn Huskies men's basketball coaches
UConn Huskies men's basketball players
Wesleyan Cardinals men's basketball coaches
Yale Bulldogs men's basketball coaches